Sons of Table Mountain is a jazz band of Robbie Jansen, a South African musician from Cape Town. The band members are Robbie Jansen, pianist Hilton Schilder, Steven Erasmus, Jack Momplé and Alex van Heerden. Jansen released his second album in 2000, Cape Doctor, having used the group to record with him. They were one of the pioneers of the new Cape Jazz.

External links
  Memoirs of Alex van Heerden, including information about Sons of Table Mountain.
  About Robbie Jansen (South Africa) and his work at www.music.org.za.

South African jazz ensembles